Benrath is a quarter of Düsseldorf in the south of the city, part of Borough 9. It has been a part of Düsseldorf since 1929.

History

The name Benrath came from the "Knights of Benrode". The settlement was mentioned for the first time in 1222 in a document from Cologne where Everhard de Benrode is named as an attestor. By the end of the fifth century the area is known as "Rode" or "Roide", which is a cleared area. The castle and the manor of the Benrodes became property of the Counts of Berg by the 13th century.

The first church of Benrath was constructed in 1002.
The village developed parallel to the castle. The old Church St. Cäcilia was built in that time.
Benrath is a place of pilgrimage for Roman Catholic Christians.

In the time of Industrial Revolution Benrath grew very fast, because Benrath is next to the important Cologne–Duisburg railway.

In 1929 Benrath became a part of Düsseldorf.

The Benrath line

In the German linguistics the Benrath line (or Benrather-Linie) is the borderline between the Low German and Middle German dialects, although on both side of the line there is a Rhenish dialect. It is also called maken-machen-line, since south of it speakers say machen and north of it maken, as is described in the High German consonant shift.

The Benrath Castle 
The Schloss Benrath (Benrath Castle) is one of the greatest baroque castles in Germany. The castle contains a museum.
The park of the castle is very famous, too.

Regular events 

August:
Schloss concerts
Bier Boerse!
October:
Second Sunday: Light procession through the park of the castle around the Spiegelweiher with the "Black Madonna of Benrath"
November and December:
Advent market and Christmas market

Schools 

 Annette-von-Droste-Hülshoff-Gymnasium
 Schloß-Gymnasium Benrath
 Realschule Benrath
  Common Hauptschule Benrath,
 Catholic Grundschule: 
 St.-Cäcilia-School
 Catholic Grundschule Einsiedelstraße,
 Common Grundschule Erich-Müller-Straße

Sports associations 
 TSG Benrath 1881 e.V.
 Ruder-Gesellschaft Benrath 1908 e.V.
 Sportgemeinschaft Benrath-Hassels 1910/12 e.V.
 Tennisclub Benrath 1913 e.V.
 VfL Benrath 06 e.V.
 Schützenbruderschaft St. Cäcilia Benrath e.V. von 1553
 DEC Devils e.V. – women icehockey in Düsseldorf

Sports venues  
 Sparkassen-Eissporthalle (Sparkasse skating arena), foundation of the Stadtsparkasse Düsseldorf (Savings and loan association Düsseldorf), Paulsmühlenstraße 6

Personalities 
 Harry Piel, German film director and actor
 Karl Hohmann, Germany national football team player
 William, Prince of Hohenzollern, head of the house Hohenzollern-Sigmaringen (1905–1927)

Trails 
In Benrath begin resp. end the following marked trails of the Sauerländischer Gebirgsverein (SGV. Sauerland mountain association):
 The Schlösserweg, trail blazing X19: Benrath, railway station – Dillenburg in Hessen
 The Düsseldorfer Weg, trail blazing D: Benrath, Schöne Aussicht – Kaiserswerth

Traffic 

Benrath possesses a regional railway station on the railway track Cologne–Duisburg line of the historic Cologne-Minden Railway Company. The Düsseldorf-Benrath station is a pre-modern clinker brick building Bahnhof from the 1930s and the second railway station at this place. It is served by two Regional-Express  services: RE 1 (NRW-Express) and RE 5 (Rhein-Express) and Rhine-Ruhr S-Bahn line S 6, all operated by Deutsche Bahn.

A Tram of the Rheinbahn, the line 701, connects Benrath to the city of Düsseldorf.
Furthermore, there are the bus lines 730 Urdenbach-Lohausen, 778/779 circle course Garath, 784 Urdenbach–Hilden–Wuppertal-Vohwinkel, 788 Benrath Ost–Monheim am Rhein (Busanzeige Monamare) and 789 Holthausen–Monheim am Rhein (Busanzeige Monamare) in Benrath.

By 1962 there was a one rail narrow gauge tram from Benrath (beginning in the Paulistraße) via Hilden to Solingen-Ohligs resp. to Haan und Wuppertal-Vohwinkel. This narrow gauge railway tram went beyond  Benrath to Düsseldorf, Oberbilker Markt, and formed the so-called Benrather Netz, that was bought  by Düsseldorf in 1910, hence before the amalgamation of Benrath.  the multiple unit No. 107 of this narrow gauge railway is preserved in the Bergisches Straßenbahnmuseum in Wuppertal-Kohlfurt.

At the Autobahn A59 there is a Anschlussstelle „Düsseldorf-Benrath“.

Literature 
 Wolfgang D. Sauer: Düsseldorf-Benrath. Alte Bilder erzählen. Sutton Verlag, Erfurt 2006, 
 Benrather Heimatgeschichte, hrsg.v. Benrather Kulturkreis e.V. und der Heimatgemeinschaft Groß-Benrath e.V., Düsseldorf 1956, erw. Neuaufl. Düsseldorf 1974

References

External links 
Heimatarchiv Groß-Benrath (German)
History (German)
Communal Administration (German)
Communal Administration, District Office (German)
Duesselgo Websites from Düsseldorf-Benrath 
Benrath market now Harry-Piel-Platz (German)

Urban districts and boroughs of Düsseldorf